Conus globoponderosus is a fossil species of sea snail, a marine gastropod mollusk in the family Conidae, the cone snails, cone shells or cones.

Description

Distribution
This marine species of cone snail is found only in the fossil state in the Miocene and Tertiary of Austria and Italy, Europe.

References

 Sacco, F., 1893. I Molluschi dei Terreni Terziarii del Piemonte e della Liguria. Pt. XIII. Conidae and Conorbidae. Memorie della Reale Accademia delle Scienze di Torino, 2 (44 ): 1 -134
 1958, Sieber. Ann.Nathist.Mus.Wien 62:123 (taxonomic revision)
 1960, Glibert. Mem.Inst.R.Sci.Nat.Belg.ser.2,fasc.64,p. 91ff.

External links

globoponderosus